Calvin Holman served in the Arizona House of Representatives from 1975 to 1985. A Republican, Holman represented District 24 in the Paradise Valley, Arizona area.

During his 10 years in the House he was on the following committees:

Chairman of Banking and Insurance Committee
Chairman of Administration Committee
Health and Aging Committee
Public Institutions Committee
Counties and Municipalities Committee
Joint Legislative Oversight Committee and permanent subcommittee on Insurance
Appropriations Committee
Transportation Committee
Joint Legislative Reeapportionment and Redistricting Committee
 Member of the Legislative Council

After leaving the Arizona House of Representatives Holman served as the Director of the Arizona Insurance Council which is a group of 60 insurance companies for 10 years. He then served on the Arizona Council for the Hearing Impaired where he was chairman from 1998 to 2001.

Holman's community involvement was extensive. After serving the Arizona Legislature, Holman served as a Chairman of the District 24 and District 17 Republican Party and as President of the Scottsdale Republican Forum. Wembley, London

In January 2008 the Arizona Republican Party gave Calvin a medal posthumously - For Untiring Work and Dedication in Legislative District 8. At the same time the Arizona Republican Party's annual award for volunteerism was named in honor of Cal.

Personal 
Holman was born in Topeka, Kansas on March 30, 1931. Holman earned an undergraduate degree in American history from Harvard University in 1952. He then served in the United States Army Corps of Engineers. After being seriously injured while in the service Holman earned an MBA from Stanford University in 1956. After college he began his career at the Northern Trust Company in Chicago.

He was married to his wife, Elizabeth for 51 years and had two children, Calvin (Mark) on March 17, 1957, and Mary on September 30, 1958. Holman moved to Phoenix in 1961 to work at the Valley National Bank.

Holman was active in the community as President of the Homeowners Association and a member of Scottsdale Sunrise Rotary, where he was a Paul Harris Fellow.

Holman had a perfect attendance record at Rotary International. His father was active in Rotary International as is his daughter, Mary, and daughter in law, Virginia Ann. In his honor Scottsdale Sunrise Rotary has established a scholarship for aspiring political leaders at Scottsdale Community College.

Holman was personally popular and media reports after his death quoted many friends praising his integrity and public service.

Holman was killed in an automobile accident on December 28, 2007. Two men were allegedly street racing and crashed into Holman's 1973 Camaro. They were subsequently arrested and charged with second degree murder.

References

External links
 Arizona Legislators: Then & Now
 Photos of Calvin Holman and his life
 Friends of Calvin Holman
 Cal Holman Scholarship
 Obituary Guest Book
 Grave Site

Republican Party members of the Arizona House of Representatives
1931 births
2007 deaths
Harvard University alumni
20th-century American politicians
Stanford Graduate School of Business alumni
Road incident deaths in Arizona